Crazies is a 1991 Soviet comedy film directed by Alla Surikova.

Plot 
The film tells the almost fantastic story of the construction of the railway from Saint Petersburg to Tsarskoye Selo.

Cast 
 Nikolai Karachentsov as Rodion Kiryukhin
 Leonid Yarmolnik as Tikhon Zaitsev
 Sergey Stepanchenko as Fyodor 'Pirandello'
 Olga Kabo as Masha
 Natalya Gundareva as Countess Otreshkova
 Mikhail Boyarsky as Emperor Nicholas I of Russia
 Aleksei Zharkov as Alexander von Benckendorff
 Semyon Farada as a Russian secret agent in Austria
 Natalya Krachkovskaya as the agent's wife
Vsevolod Larionov as Knyaz Rozanov-Razdorsky
Aleksandr Shirvindt as George Stephenson
Mikhail Derzhavin as Thaddeus Bulgarin
Donovan Scott as a robber with a frog
Vladislav Strzhelchik as general-cuckold (uncredited)

References

External links 
 

1991 films
Films scored by Gennady Gladkov
1990s Russian-language films
Soviet comedy films
1991 comedy films
Cultural depictions of Nicholas I of Russia
Rail transport films
Films based on Russian novels